The Strachan Open was a professional snooker tournament held between 1992 and 1994. It had varying ranking status during its history.

History 
The tournament was first held in 1992, and was a ranking tournament. It was sponsored by billiard cloth company Strachan. The event was boycotted by several top players due to lower points tariff and prize money. The final stages were played at the Thornbury Leisure Centre in Thornbury. Peter Ebdon made his first official maximum break in the qualifying rounds against Wayne Martin.

The following season to encourage the new professional, the World Professional Billiards and Snooker Association created four so-called minor ranking events. These tournaments were open to every professional, but earned only one-tenth of the ranking points of most other ranking tournaments. Three of the four minor ranking events were Strachan Challenges. The fourth was the Benson & Hedges Championship. Most of the top sixteen players did not bother to enter. The Strachan Challenges continued for one more season with two events, but they did not carry ranking points.

Winners

References

Snooker ranking tournaments
Snooker minor-ranking tournaments
Recurring sporting events established in 1992
Recurring events disestablished in 1994
1992 establishments in England
1994 disestablishments in England
Snooker competitions in England
Defunct snooker competitions
Defunct sports competitions in England